In polymer physics, Maltese Cross is a set of four symmetrically disposed sectors of high extinction that is displayed when a polymer is observed under polarized lights. This is usually observed when trying to observe spheruliltes in polymers.
Polymer physics